The Olympus Camedia C-700 Ultra Zoom is a digital camera manufactured by Olympus. It was first released in May 2001 and was manufactured in Korea.

Features and lens 
The "Ultra Zoom" in the camera's name refers to its unusually wide 10:1 zoom range, being a significant increase over the more typical 3:1 zoom range of contemporary standard digital cameras.

The lens is an Olympus aspherical glass zoom lens, 5.9 mm to 59 mm focal length, f/2.8 to f/3.5 aperture, 10 elements in 7 groups. The 10× zoom is equivalent to 38–380 mm in 35 mm film photography.

The Camedia C-700 offers 1-2.7× seamless digital zoom. Combined with the optical zoom, the total zoom range is 27:1.

Removable image storage is provided by a 3.3V SmartMedia Card, in capacities of 8, 16, 32, 64 or 128 megabytes. Non-Olympus memory cards must be formatted in the camera.

The camera is equipped with an Olympus exclusive miniature 4-contact USB jack. The included USB accessory cable plugs into a standard USB-A jack on a computer. A driver is needed to connect to Microsoft Windows 98 SE for image transfer, but Windows 2000 and later, as well as most Linux and Apple Mac OS X systems automatically recognize the camera as an external hard drive.

A standard UNC 1/4-20 tripod thread is provided on the bottom of the camera body. An electronic self-timer is built in, and a flashing red light-emitting diode (LED) on the front of the camera indicates automatic shutter status. An audio beep can be selectively activated or muted to provide shutter feedback to the user.

Flash 
The camera has a built-in manual pop-up flash. The flash operates in automatic, red-eye, forced and slow synchronization modes. A 5-pin jack for an external flash cable is provided, but there is no hot shoe flash connector.

Still images 
Still images are stored in lossless, uncompressed TIFF (.tif) format, or lossy JPEG (.jpg) format. The camera supports pixel resolutions of 640x480, 1024x768, 1280x960 and 1600x1200.

Movies 
Movies can be recorded with sound and the recording time is dependent on the memory card capacity. They are in QuickTime (.mov) format. There is a built-in microphone on top of the camera, but there is no provision for an external microphone.

Power sources 
The camera can use four (4) AA alkaline primary cells, four nickel-cadmium (NiCd) AA rechargeable cells, or four nickel-metal hydride (NiMH) AA rechargeable cells so that, in the end, two 3 V series-connections will supply the device (given that each cell provides approximately 1.5 V). Alternatively, it also takes two LB-01 (CR-V3) lithium cells. It is provided with a jack for an external AC power adapter, supplying 5.0 to 6.5 volts DC (6.0 volts nominal) to the camera.

References 

 

C-700
Cameras introduced in 2001